S Wonderful! is a 1956 album by Ray Conniff, his orchestra and (wordless) chorus. It was his first album released under his name. The album was produced completely in Mono by Mitch Miller at Columbia Records' 30th Street Studios in New York City.

Critical reception

The Allmusic review by William Ruhlmann gave the album 4.5 stars stating "Conniff updated the big band sound to the '50s, retaining its danceable tempos and building upon the unison section innovations of Glenn Miller...Employing standards with familiar melodies, the imaginativeness of his work became all the more noticeable."

Track listing

Recording dates
Recording dates based on Ray Conniff's diaries:
 November 11, 1955: Stardust/Begin the Beguine (to be released as a single first)
 March 26, 1956: Dancing in the Dark/That Old Black Magic
 June 15, 1956: September Song/Speak Low/I Get a Kick Out of You/Sometimes I'm Happy
 June 18, 1956: 'S Wonderful/Wagon Wheels/I'm an Old Cowhand/Sentimental Journey

References

1956 albums
Columbia Records albums
Ray Conniff albums
Albums produced by Ray Conniff
Albums recorded at CBS 30th Street Studio